Trevor Rainbolt (born November 7, 1998), known mononymously as Rainbolt, is an American player of GeoGuessr, an online game where players see a photo from Google Street View and guess what location in the world it is from. Widely regarded as one of the best GeoGuessr players, he became popular through TikTok, where he posted videos of him discovering the exact location of memes and music videos, as well as achieving a high score despite additional challenges and limitations he imposed on himself, such as seeing a photo for only 1 second. He posts videos on YouTube and hosts weekly livestreams on Twitch.

Personal life 
Rainbolt grew up in Arkansas and attended university for one year at the University of Colorado Colorado Springs before dropping out to work in Los Angeles as a social media strategist for a company that runs sports entertainment accounts on Instagram, TikTok, and Snapchat. 

Despite his knowledge of world geography, he had only left the United States once briefly until November 2022, when he announced on Twitter that he would be living in a different country each month, starting in Germany, Spain, and Portugal. As of January 2023, he was living in Bangkok, Thailand, where he planned to stay for a few months.

Career 

Rainbolt started training his GeoGuessr skills during the COVID-19 pandemic by playing for four to five hours every day, studying landmarks like signs and telephone poles, and watching others livestream. At some points he was playing up to 12-hour days, even dreaming in Street View.

Rainbolt posts on TikTok under the username "georainbolt", an account he started in October 2021. He also hosts pro GeoGuessr tournament livestreams on Twitch every Saturday, where the top players compete in 2v2, 3v3, or 4v4 brackets for a cash prize. Rainbolt posts videos on YouTube of these tournaments, and other GeoGuessr tips, on his main channel "RAINBOLT". On his second channel, "RAINBOLT TWO", he posts multiple GeoGuessr videos per week.

He became viral for adding challenge by creating limitations: he guesses the location by seeing a Street View image for only a tenth of a second, with half the image blurred, two photos at once, upside down, in black and white, or pixelated. In some videos, he identifies the location while blindfolded with someone else describing the scene to him. He has even identified countries based only on viewing the dirt.

References 

Social media influencers
Social media accounts
Instagram accounts
Twitter accounts
People from Arkansas
American YouTubers
American_TikTokers
GeoGuessr players
1998 births
Living people